Living Funeral is a 2013 is a Nigerian Nollywood movie produced by Mrs Orode Ryan-Okpu and directed by Udoka Oyeka under the sponsorship of Pink Pearl Foundation. The movie that sensitises the public on early discovery of breast cancer stars Liz Benson-Ameye, Norbert Young and Stephanie Wilson.

Synopsis 
The movie tells the ordeal of a young woman who had to face the reality of battling with a breast cancer. It also portrays how cordial relationship with the victim of any terminal diseases can help to boost their physical and psychological morale.

Premiere 
The movie was premiered in Lagos in October 2013 and later in Asaba, Delta State in December 2013.

Award and nominations 
The movie was nominated for eight Africa Magic Viewers’ Choice Awards (AMVCAs) in 2013. The categories are;

Best Movie 2013 (Orode Ryan-Okpu and Udoka Oyeka);

Best Movie-Drama (Orode Ryan-Okpu and Udoka Oyeka);

Best Movie Director (Udoka Oyeka);

Best Actress in a Drama (Stephanie Wilson);

Best Supporting Actress in a Drama (Liz Ameye).

Best Writer-Drama (Akpor Kagho);

Best Cinematographer (Idhebor Kagho); and Best Lighting Designer (Godwin Daniel).

References 

2013 films
Nigerian drama films
English-language Nigerian films